Chhatrasal is a 2021 Indian Hindi-language Historical drama web series based on the life of Maharaja Chhatrasal, who fought against the Mughal Empire, and in 1675 established his kingdom in Bundelkhand.
The film is directed by Anadii Chaturvedi and stars Neena Gupta, Ashutosh Rana, Jitin Gulati, Vaibhavi Shandilya, Manish Wadhwa, Manmohan Tiwari and Rudra Soni. The film premiered and aired on OTT platform MX Player

Cast
 Neena Gupta as the narrator
 Jitin Gulati as Maharaja Chhatrasal
 Vaibhavi Shandilya as Devkunwari, wife of Maharaja Chhatrasal
 Ashutosh Rana as Aurangzeb, the Mughal Emperor
Manish Wadhwa
 Anushka Luhar
 Manmohan Tiwari
 Rudra Soni

Secondary cast 

 Sangam Rai as Champat Rai
 Bhupendra as Mahabali Patel
 Lokesh Batta as Bal Diwan
 Yash Buddhadeb as Young Aurangzeb
 Vikas Singh as Pahaad Singh
 Ali Mughal as Baki Khan
 BK Modi as Shahjahan
 Zidan as Child Chhatrasal
 Ajay Mehar as Vidvan
 Harsh as Mohan Singh
 Pramod Tripathi as Sarpanch
 Shyam Sundar as Village Pandit
 Krishnan Sardani as Bheemingh
 Jitendra Bohra as Anirudh Singh
 Kalyani Jha as Village Mother
 Pradeep Tiwari as Karan
 Visha Rai as Sambhu
 Maushami Udeshi as Mehbooba
 Arbendra Singh as Riyaaz Khan
 Kamaldeep Maan as Fidai Khan
 Nikhil Tyagi as Hriday Shah
 Vikas Khokar as Jagat Rai
 Sudeep Sarangi as South Pandit
 Anil as Shubkaran
 Himanshu as Jai Singh
 Yash as Keshav Das
 Shaan Kakkar as Kok Singh
 Yash Puri as Dev Karan
 Amit Lekhawani as Bahadur Khan
 Shivam as Mittho Peerzada
 Vinay Yadav as Fauze Miyan
 Deepak Narang as Sher Afagan Khan
 Jolly Bhatia as Angad Rai’s wife
 Nishant Singh as Chhatrapati Shivaji Maharaj
 Azad Chauhan as Keshav Rai Dangi
 Prakhar Saxena as Ruh Allah Khan
 Bhushan as Kavi Bhushan
 Akanksha as Tej Kunwari

References

External links
 
 Chhatrasal film on MXPlayer

Indian drama web series
MX Player original programming